The RDW is a Dutch organization that handles the type-approval and registration of motorized vehicles and driving licences in the Netherlands. This is not limited to passenger cars, but also includes trucks, tractors, bicycles, scooters, drones and more. The RDW is an independent administrative body of the Dutch government.

Statutory tasks 
The RDW is responsible for four different subjects in the Netherlands:

Type-approval and licensing 
The RDW is authorized for conducting Motor vehicle type approvals for the entire European Union, and is often chosen by foreign car manufacturers and brand due to a lack of competition from Dutch automobile manufacturers.

Supervision and control 
The RDW is responsible for supervising Dutch RDW-approved garages and repair-shops for road-legal vehicles. Moreover, the RDW maintains registration of vehicles and the annual vehicle state inspection called "APK". While these inspections and repairs can be conducted by privately-owned companies, these companies have to be registered with the RDW and the RDW frequently visits and samples the performance, integrity and reliability of the companies, issuing punishments for companies that are found to fraud with approvals.

Information provision 
The RDW keeps multiple public databases available in regard to public parking, vehicle safety, registration and APK-history among other data and informs the public about current developments in the automotive sector. Furthermore, the RDW advises the government in law-making.

Issuing documents 
In the Netherlands, driving licences can be acquired by graduating exams at the Centraal Bureau Rijvaardigheid (Central Bureau of Driving Skills) and requesting such cards at the municipality office of the citizen applying. The RDW is responsible for producing and issuing the physical card that individuals receive, which is also valid as personal identification in the Netherlands.

Trivia 

 Originally named "Rijksdienst voor het Wegverkeer", Dutch law references to the organisation as "Dienst Wegverkeer", while defining that the public name is written and pronounced as "RDW".
 The RDW has two foreign offices, one in Detroit, Michigan, United States and one in Seoul, South Korea.

References 

Motor vehicle registration agencies
Government agencies of the Netherlands